In abstract algebra, the Cartan–Brauer–Hua theorem (named after Richard Brauer, Élie Cartan, and Hua Luogeng) is a theorem pertaining to division rings. In other words, if the unit group of K is a normal subgroup of the unit group of D, then either  or K is central .

References

 

Theorems in ring theory